The Brussels International Exposition of 1910 was a world's fair held in Brussels, Belgium, from 23 April to 1 November 1910. This was just thirteen years after Brussels' previous world's fair. It received 13 million visitors, covered  and lost 100,000 Belgian Francs.

Location
The grounds and buildings were partly located around the Solbosch district (in the City of Brussels' southern extension), and partly in the Parc du Cinquantenaire/Jubelpark (a remainder of the 1897 World's Fair), where the fine art's exhibition took place. The colonial exhibition was hosted in the newly built , today's Royal Museum for Central Africa, in the suburb of Tervuren. Another major site for the exhibition was the Mont des Arts/Kunstberg in central Brussels, although this site was largely demolished during the post-war construction process of Brusselisation.

Country participation
There were 26 participating countries: Brazil, Canada, China, Denmark, Dominican Republic, France, Germany (whose Attaché des Reichskommissars was Heinrich Albert), Great Britain, Greece, Guatemala, Haiti, Italy, Japan, Luxembourg, Monaco, Netherlands, Nicaragua, Persia, Peru, Russia, Spain, Switzerland, Turkey, United States and Uruguay. 

The Dutch and German pavilions displayed the decorative arts and architecture of their home country. The Italian pavilion illustrated the Italian Renaissance. The Belgian pavilion was represented through the cities of Brussels, Ghent, Antwerp and Liège.

Exhibits
The exhibition was dedicated to science, the arts, industry and trade. The fine art's section included modern art loaned by the French including three works each by Claude Monet, Auguste Rodin and Auguste Renoir, as well as two works by Henri Matisse. Painters who participated included the Belgian Aloïs Boudry who won a silver medal, and the French Adrien Karbowsky.

During the exhibition, the altarpiece of St. John Berchman's Church was presented. The Belgian engineer  also exhibited his new Type 10 pacific locomotive.

Fire
There was a big fire on 14 and 15 August which gutted several pavilions in the Solbosch part of the exhibition. Part of the Belgian and French sections were destroyed, but the worst hit was the English section. After the fire, some destroyed parts were rebuilt at a rapid pace. This event attracted the attention of the public and the organisers were able to successfully use it for the promotion of the exhibition.

Legacy
The Hotel Astoria was built for the fair, at 101–103, rue Royale/Koningsstraat, and is now a protected monument by the Monuments and Sites Directorate of the Brussels-Capital Region.

See also
 Human zoo
 Brussels International Exposition (1935)
 Expo 58

References

Notes

Further reading
 M. Dumoulin, L'entrée dans le XXè siècle (in French), Brussels, Le Cri édition, 2010.
 M. Dumoulin, 1900-1913 La fin d’une époque (in French), in Les grands événements du xxe siècle en Belgique, Brussels, NV Reader's Digest, 1987.
 S. Jaumain et W. Balcers (dir.), Bruxelles 1910 : de l'Exposition Universelle à l'Université (in French), Brussels, Racine, 2010.
 Anonymous, Livre d’Or Exposition universelle et internationale de Bruxelles 1910 (in French), EM. Rossel, 1910.
 Anonymous, Guide pratique : Bruxelles et les Faubourgs et l’Exposition Universelle 1910 (in French), Brussels, A. De Boeck, 1910.
 Y. Manhes, Histoire des Belges et de la Belgique (in French), Paris, Vuilbert, 2005.

External links

 Official website of the BIE
 Exposition Universelle de Bruxelles 1910 - hundreds of postcards and pictures
 1910 Brussels (BIE World Expo) - approximately 75 links

World's fairs in Brussels
1910 in Belgium
Colonial exhibitions
1910s in Brussels